Heathcliff may refer to:

 Heathcliff (Wuthering Heights), the central character from the novel Wuthering Heights by Emily Brontë
 Heathcliff (musical), a musical based on the book Wuthering Heights
 Heathcliff Slocumb, a former American baseball player
 Heathcliff (comic strip), a comic strip about a cat of the same name
 Heathcliff (1980 TV series), a cartoon based on the above comic strip, produced by Ruby-Spears
 Heathcliff (1984 TV series), a cartoon based on the same comic strip, produced by DiC
 Heathcliff: The Movie, a theatrical film composed mainly of several episodes of the 1984 TV series
 Dr. Heathcliff "Cliff" Huxtable, the lead character on The Cosby Show, played by Bill Cosby
 Heathcliffe Hope, a character from the TV series Emmerdale